Alexander Mills may refer to:

 Alexander Mills, North Carolina, a town in Rutherford County, North Carolina
 Alexander Rud Mills (1885–1964), Australian barrister, author and Nazi sympathiser